The Coudé Auxiliary Telescope (CAT) is a coudé focus telescope located at the Lick Observatory near San Jose, California, south of Shane Dome, Tycho Brahe Peak.

The Coudé Auxiliary Telescope, built in 1969, is a 0.6m (24-inch) reflecting telescope in a stationary position at a fixed focus. The CAT is generally used for observation of brighter stars, since it collects less light than the 120-inch Shane.

See also
La Silla Observatory which has a 1.4m Coudé Auxiliary Telescope on the ESO 3.6 m Telescope
List of astronomical observatories

References

External links
A User Guide
Coudé Auxiliary Telescope on Lick Observatory's website

Optical telescopes
Lick Observatory